Luis Ignacio Ortega Álvarez (14 January 1953 – 15 April 2015) was a Spanish judge. He served on the Constitutional Court of Spain since January 2011. He was noted as an expert of Spanish public law.

Biography

Ortega was born in 1953 in Madrid. He did his doctoral studies in Rome. Ortega worked at the University of Castilla–La Mancha (UCLM) since 1988. He obtained the Jean Monnet chair in 1999 and started the Center for European Studies at the UCLM.

On 12 January 2011 he was installed as judge on the Constitutional Court of Spain. In 2010 he was elected by the Senate of Spain on proposal of the parliament of Castilla-La Mancha. He was noted as a defender of civil and workers rights on the court, writing dissenting opinions against the majority vote.

Ortega died on 15 April 2015, aged 62. He had an infarction while present in the Constitutional Court building during a recess of the court.

References

1953 births
2015 deaths
Lawyers from Madrid
20th-century Spanish judges
Academic staff of the University of Castilla–La Mancha
21st-century Spanish judges